Petra Komínková (born 17 November 1951) is a Czech handball player, born in Olomouc. 

She played for the Czechoslovak national team, and represented Czechoslovakia at the 1980 Summer Olympics in Moscow.

References

External links

1951 births
Living people
Sportspeople from Olomouc
Czechoslovak female handball players
Olympic handball players of Czechoslovakia
Handball players at the 1980 Summer Olympics